Winnemucca can refer to:

Places
Winnemucca, Nevada
Winnemucca Indian Colony, a reservation in Nevada
Winnemucca Lake, a dry lake bed in Nevada

Tribes
Winnemucca Indian Colony of Nevada, a federally recognized Northern Paiute and Western Shoshone tribe

People
Poito, also known as Chief Winnemucca, a chief of the Northern Paiute
Numaga, also known as Young Winnemucca, a war chief of the Northern Paiute and Poito's nephew
 Natchez, also known as Little Winnemucca, a chief of the Northern Paiute and Poito's son
Poito's daughter, Sarah Winnemucca, activist, educator, and advocate for the Northern Paiute.
Chief Truckee, Poito's father, a chief of the Northern Paiute.